Rue Danielle Casanova (English: Danielle-Casanova Street) is a road in the 1st and 2nd arrondissements of Paris, France.

History 
The road is named after Danielle Casanova, a famous French communist and resistance fighter who died in deportation to the Auschwitz concentration camp in 1943.

References

See also 

 Transport in Paris

Shopping districts and streets in France
Streets in the 1st arrondissement of Paris
Streets in the 2nd arrondissement of Paris